Claudio Elías Sepúlveda Castro (born 19 June 1992), known as Claudio Sepúlveda, is a Chilean footballer who plays as defensive midfielder for Huachipato in Chile's Primera División.

Notes

External links
 cruzados profile
 
 

1992 births
Living people
Chilean footballers
Chilean Primera División players
Primera B de Chile players
C.D. Huachipato footballers
Rangers de Talca footballers
Club Deportivo Universidad Católica footballers
Association football midfielders